Brown County is a county in the U.S. state of Ohio. As of the 2020 United States Census, the population was 43,676. The county seat and largest city is Georgetown. The county was created in 1818 and is named for Major General Jacob Brown, an officer in the War of 1812 who was wounded at the Battle of Lundy's Lane. Brown County is part of the Cincinnati-Middletown, OH-KY-IN Metropolitan Statistical Area.

History

After the American Revolutionary War, the federal government established the Northwest Territory, a large area which encompassed the present county. In 1790 several counties were established, Hamilton among them. In 1797, a portion of Hamilton was partitioned off to create Adams County, and in 1800 another portion was partitioned to create Clermont. This lasted for two decades, during which the area north of the Ohio River attracted settlers.

Among the early settlers was Jesse Root Grant (father of future US President Grant), who built a home and set up a tannery in the future Georgetown area, where young Hiram Ulysses (later changed to Ulysses S.) spent his youth.

On 1 March 1818, portions of Adams and Clermont counties were partitioned off to create Brown County, with Georgetown as its seat. The boundaries of the county were altered in 1874, when a portion was moved to Highland County; they have remained intact since then.

Brown County was said to be the place of origin of the White Burley type of tobacco, grown in 1864 by George Webb and Joseph Fore on the farm of Captain Frederick Kautz near Higginsport, with seed from Bracken County, Kentucky. He noticed it yielded a different type of light leaf shaded from white to yellow, and cured differently.  By 1866, he harvested 20,000 pounds of Burley tobacco and sold it in 1867 at the St. Louis Fair for $58 per hundred pounds. By 1883, the principal market for this tobacco was Cincinnati, but it was grown throughout central Kentucky and Middle Tennessee. Later the type became referred to as burley tobacco, and it was air-cured.

Geography
Brown County lies on the south line of the state of Ohio. Its south border abuts the north border of the state of Kentucky across the Ohio River. The Ohio flows westward along the county's south line. White Oak Creek flows southward through the lower part of southwest Brown County, discharging into the Ohio at Higginsport; Straight Creek flows southwestward through the lower central part of the county, discharging into the Ohio two miles (3 km) east of Higginsport. Eagle Creek flows southerly through the lower eastern part of the county, discharging into the Ohio east of Ripley. The east fork of the Little Miami River flows southwestward through the upper part of the county, entering Clermont County near Marathon.

The terrain of Brown County consists of low rolling hills, carved by drainages. All available areas are devoted to agriculture. The highest point (at 1,089' or 332 m ASL) in Brown County is a point on Ash Ridge, 9 miles (15 km) southeast of Lake Waynoka.

Main highways

Adjacent counties

 Clinton County - north
 Highland County - northeast
 Adams County - east
 Mason County, Kentucky - southeast
 Bracken County, Kentucky - southwest
 Clermont County - west

Lakes
 Grant Lake
 Lake Lorelei
 Lake Waynoka

Protected areas
 Della Gates and Charles Bott Wildlife Area
 Grant Lake Wildlife Area
 Indian Creek Wildlife Area
 Eagle Creek Wildlife Area

Demographics

2010 census
As of the 2010 United States Census, there were 44,846 people, 17,014 households, and 12,379 families in the county. The population density was 91.5/sqmi (35.3/km2). There were 19,301 housing units at an average density of 39.4/sqmi (15.2/km2). The racial makeup of the county was 97.5% white, 0.9% black or African American, 0.2% Asian, 0.2% American Indian, 0.2% from other races, and 1.0% from two or more races. Those of Hispanic or Latino origin made up 0.6% of the population. In terms of ancestry, 27.0% were German, 14.2% were Irish, 12.5% were American, and 9.7% were English.

Of the 17,014 households, 34.5% had children under the age of 18 living with them, 55.7% were married couples living together, 11.2% had a female householder with no husband present, 27.2% were non-families, and 22.6% of all households were made up of individuals. The average household size was 2.60 and the average family size was 3.02. The median age was 39.9 years.

The median income for a household in the county was $45,887 and the median income for a family was $54,184. Males had a median income of $39,049 versus $30,890 for females. The per capita income for the county was $20,167. About 9.0% of families and 12.4% of the population were below the poverty line, including 18.2% of those under age 18 and 8.4% of those age 65 or over.

2000 census
As of the 2000 United States Census, there were 42,285 people, 15,555 households, and 11,790 families in the county. The population density was 86.3/sqmi (33.3/km2). There were 17,193 housing units at an average density of 35.1/sqmi (13.5/km2). The racial makeup of the county was 98.08% White, 0.92% Black or African American, 0.18% Native American, 0.13% Asian, 0.08% from other races, and 0.60% from two or more races. 0.44% of the population were Hispanic or Latino of any race. 29.5% were of American, 28.2% German, 10.7% English and 10.2% Irish ancestry.

There were 15,555 households, out of which 37.10% had children under the age of 18 living with them, 61.30% were married couples living together, 10.00% had a female householder with no husband present, and 24.20% were non-families. 20.20% of all households were made up of individuals, and 8.50% had someone living alone who was 65 years of age or older. The average household size was 2.69 and the average family size was 3.09.

The county population contained 27.60% under the age of 18, 8.10% from 18 to 24, 30.30% from 25 to 44, 22.40% from 45 to 64, and 11.60% who were 65 years of age or older. The median age was 35 years. For every 100 females there were 96.80 males. For every 100 females age 18 and over, there were 94.80 males.

The county's median household income was $38,303, and the median family income was $43,040. Males had a median income of $32,647 versus $22,483 for females. The per capita income for the county was $17,100. About 8.80% of families and 11.60% of the population were below the poverty line, including 15.20% of those under age 18 and 9.40% of those age 65 or over.

Politics
Prior to 1928, Brown County was a Democratic Party stronghold in presidential elections. 1928 to 1988 saw the county become a swing county, backing the national winner in all but 1944 & 1960. It has since become a Republican Party stronghold, with Jimmy Carter in 1976 representing the last Democratic win of the county at the presidential level but Bill Clinton came within just 372 votes in 1992 and 652 votes in 1996.

|}

Government

Brown County has three County Commissioners who oversee the various County departments. Commissioners (as of Nov. 2018) are:
 Barry Woodruff (R)
 Daryll Gray (R)
 Tony Applegate (R)

Media

Radio
 WRAC C103 Country 103.1 FM (West Union)
 WAOL 99.5 (Ripley)

Newspapers
 The News Democrat (Georgetown)
 The Brown County Press (Mount Orab)
 The County Free Press (Georgetown, Monthly)
 The Ripley Bee (Ripley, Weekly)

Communities

Villages

 Aberdeen
 Fayetteville
 Georgetown (county seat)
 Hamersville
 Higginsport
 Mount Orab
 Ripley
 Russellville
 Sardinia

Census-designated places
 Lake Lorelei
 Lake Waynoka
 St. Martin

Unincorporated communities

 Arnheim
 Ash Ridge
 Bardwell
 Boudes Ferry
 Brownstown
 Centerville
 Chasetown
 Crosstown
 Decatur
 Eastwood
 Ellsberry
 Feesburg
 Fincastle
 Fivemile
 Greenbush
 Hiett
 Levanna
 Locust Ridge
 Macon
 Maple
 Neals Corner
 Neel
 New Harmony
 New Hope
 Redoak
 Upper Fivemile
 Vera Cruz
 Wahlsburg
 White Oak
 White Oak Valley

Townships

 Byrd
 Clark
 Eagle
 Franklin
 Green
 Huntington
 Jackson
 Jefferson
 Lewis
 Perry
 Pike
 Pleasant
 Scott
 Sterling
 Union
 Washington

See also
 National Register of Historic Places listings in Brown County, Ohio

References

External links
 Brown County News
 Brown County Government

 
Appalachian Ohio
Counties of Appalachia
Ohio counties on the Ohio River
1818 establishments in Ohio
Populated places established in 1818